Schrödinger's paradox may refer to two ideas by Erwin Schrödinger:

Schrödinger's cat, a thought experiment relating to quantum physics
Schrödinger's paradox, the paradox that living systems increase their organization despite the second law of thermodynamics. See entropy and life.